Conolophus pallidus (the Santa Fe land iguana or Barrington land iguana) is a species of lizard in the family Iguanidae.  It is one of three species in the genus Conolophus and is endemic to Santa Fe Island in the Galapagos.

Taxonomy
The species was first described by American zoologist Edmund Heller in 1903. Some authorities have questioned whether C. pallidus is a valid species in its own right or merely a variant or subspecies of the Galapagos land iguana found on other islands in the Galapagos.

Etymology
Its specific name, pallidus, is Latin for "pale", denoting its lighter coloration than C. subcristatus.

Morphology
The Santa Fe land iguana is similar to the Galapagos land iguana except that the Santa Fe land iguana is paler yellow with a longer more tapered snout and more pronounced dorsal spines.

Being cold-blooded, it absorbs heat from the sun basking on volcanic rocks and at night sleep in burrows to conserve its body heat. These iguanas also enjoy a symbiotic relationship with the island's finches; the birds remove parasites and ticks, providing relief to the iguana and food for the birds.

Diet
Santa Fe land iguanas are primarily herbivorous, however some individuals have shown that they are opportunistic carnivores supplementing their diet with insects, centipedes and carrion.
Because fresh water is scarce on the islands they inhabit, land iguanas obtain the majority of their moisture from the prickly-pear cactus that makes up 80% of its diet: fruit, flowers, pads, and even spines.  During the rainy season they will drink from available standing pools of water and feast on yellow flowers of the genus Portulaca.

References

pallidus
Endemic reptiles of the Galápagos Islands
Reptiles described in 1903
Taxonomy articles created by Polbot
Taxa named by Edmund Heller